The Eastern Arizona Courier is a weekly newspaper published in Safford, Arizona.  Its roots go back to March 1895, when it was founded as the Graham Guardian by the Guardian Publishing Company, and edited by John J. Birdno.  Its current circulation is approximately 8,200.

History

The Graham Guardian began publication on March 9, 1895, edited by John J. Birdno.  Birdno left the paper in 1917, and John F. Weber took over the editorial reins.  In 1922 W. M. Moore and Clyde W. Ijams became the editors, and the following year the paper merged with The Gila Valley Farmer, which had been formed in 1916.  

The Farmer's history dated back to 1882, with the creation of the Graham County News, before going through several name changes: The Clifton Clarion (1883–1889), The Valley Bulletin (1889–1890), Graham County Bulletin (1890–1897), and The Arizona Bulletin (1897–1916).  After the merger, the paper was renamed the Graham County Guardian and Gila Valley Farmer, with William B. Kelly as the editor.  Kelly had come over from the Bisbee Daily Review.

Kelly edited the paper until 1943, when it was purchased by the Gila Printing and Publishing Company, which changed the name to the Graham County Guardian. In 1946 Earl Hunt became the paper's editor.  The name remained stable until 1967, when it was merged with the Safford Eastern Arizona Courier, which was under the ownership of Wick Communications, and was renamed the Eastern Arizona Courier and Graham County Guardian.  In 1984 the paper changed its name to the Eastern Arizona Courier, which it remains to this day.

References

Newspapers published in Arizona
Publications established in 1895
Weekly newspapers published in the United States
1895 establishments in Arizona Territory